Manuel Fernando da Silva Monteiro (Anissó, Vieira do Minho, 1 April 1962) is a Portuguese jurist, professor and former politician.

Early years

Manuel Monteiro started his political life during his youth. He was elected president of the People's Youth (then called Centrist Youth) in 1986.

Political career

He was the winning candidate of the internal elections of March 1992 in the Democratic and Social Centre, moving the party from the traditional centrist base to the right. His political platform was against a Federal Europe, the Maastricht Treaty and the Economic and Monetary Union of the European Union.

In 1995 he changed the party's name to People's Party. The renamed party won 9% of the popular vote and 15 deputies, at the legislative elections held on 1 October 1995. This represented a partial comeback for the party that had been comprehensively defeated in the elections of 1987 and 1991.  Heavy losses in the local elections of 1997, however, led Monteiro to resign., being succeeded by Paulo Portas, his former friend and protégé.

Manuel Monteiro left People's Party in 2002, following a disagreement with Paulo Portas. In June 2003 he founded the New Democracy Party (PND; Partido da Nova Democracia in Portuguese). This new political force never achieved major electoral successes, and Monteiro left the party leadership in November 2008, resigning from its membership two years later. Since then he has been politically inactive.

Professional and academic career

Manuel Monteiro is a licenciate in Law from the Catholic University of Portugal. He worked at the Portuguese Industry Confederation and Banco Comercial Português. He also taught at Tomar Polytechnical Institute and Lusíada University. In 2012 he received a doctorate degree from Lusíada University.

References

1962 births
Living people
People from Vieira do Minho
Portuguese Roman Catholics
CDS – People's Party politicians
New Democracy Party (Portugal) politicians
20th-century Portuguese lawyers